The Race Is On is an album by George Jones, released on United Artists in 1965.

The title track had been recorded in June 1963 but was not released until September 1964 on the album I Get Lonely in a Hurry and the single galloped to number 3 on the Billboard country chart.  It also climbed to number 96 on the pop charts, a rarity for a Jones single, and United Artists capitalized on its success by making it the title of this 1965 release.  Jones almost always played it live in concert.  In the 1994 retrospective Golden Hits, Jones recalled that Dewey Groom first played him the song in his office at the Longhorn Ballroom in Dallas.  Jones was unimpressed with all the demo tapes Groom played for him and had started to leave when Groom played the Rollins song; Jones heard the opening line and exclaimed, "I'll take it!"  The album also includes the first recording of "She's Mine," which Jones would re-record and release as a single on Musicor in 1969, scoring another Top 10 hit.

The album peaked at number three on the US country album chart.  AllMusic calls it "one of his strongest from the mid-'60s."

Track listing
"The Race Is On" (Don Rollins)
"Don't Let the Stars Get in Your Eyes" (Slim Willet)
"I'll Never Let Go of You" (George Jones, George Riddle)
"She's Mine" (George Jones, Jack Ripley)
"Three's a Crowd" (George Jones, Darrell Edwards, Herby Treece)
"They'll Never Take Her Love from Me" (Leon Payne)
"Your Heart Turned Left (And I Was on the Right)" (Harlan Howard)
"Ain't It Funny What a Fool Will Do" (George Jones, Johnny Mathis)
"It Scares Me Half To Death" (Audrey Allison, Joe Allison)
"World's Worst Loser" (Autry Inman)
"I'm Ragged But I'm Right" (George Jones)
"Time Changes Everything" (Tommy Duncan)
"Take Me as I Am (Or Let Me Go)" (Boudleaux Bryant)

1965 albums
George Jones albums
Albums produced by Pappy Daily
United Artists Records albums